Crowan Cottage, at 1401 Woodstock Ave. in Anniston, Alabama, is a house believed to have been designed by architect Stanford White and built in 1886.  It is Richardsonian Romanesque in style.  It was listed on the National Register of Historic Places in 1975.

Its architecture is described as "derived from the innovative work of Henry Hobson Richardson. The stretching of the roof planes to form the porches, and the lifting of roof planes to form dormers are Richardsonian features as is the sculptured treatment of the shingled second story which has been modulated
to create flared surfaces and bow windows."

It is also a contributing building in the East Anniston Residential Historic District.

References

National Register of Historic Places in Calhoun County, Alabama
Richardsonian Romanesque architecture in Mississippi
Buildings and structures completed in 1886
1886 establishments in Alabama